Everywhere, and Right Here is the fourth studio album (not including a remix album, Lost Notes from Forgotten Songs) from Ohio post-rock band The Six Parts Seven.  It was released on August 31, 2004.

Track listing
 "What You Love You Must Love Now" – 5:22
 "Already Elsewhere" – 5:01
 "Saving Words for Making Sense" – 5:05
 "This One or That One?" – 6:38
 "What (We Can Just Make Out)" – 9:30
 "The Quick Fire" – 3:23
 "A Blueprint of Something Never Finished" - 7:29
 "Nightlong" - 2:11

Personnel

Six Parts Seven
Allen Karpinski - electric guitar, synthesizer
Tim Gerak - electric guitar
Jay Karpinski - drums, percussion
Mike Tolan - electric guitar, Fender Rhodes piano, bass guitar

Additional personnel
Brian Straw - acoustic guitar
Ben Vaughan - electric guitar, lap steel guitar
Steven Clements - piano
Eric Koltnow - vibraphone, percussion

References

Suicide Squeeze Records albums
Everywhere, and Right Here
Everywhere, and Right Here